John Henry Howshall (12 July 1912 – 1962) was an English footballer who played in the Football League for Accrington Stanley, Bristol Rovers, Carlisle United, Chesterfield, Southport and Stoke City.

Career
Howshall was born in Stoke-on-Trent and played amateur football with Dresden Juniors, Longton Juniors and Dresden United before joining Stoke City in 1933. He played once for Stoke in 1932–33 which came in a 1–1 draw with Wolverhampton Wanderers on 30 September 1933. He was released at the end of the season and went on to play for Football League Third Division sides Chesterfield, Southport, Bristol Rovers, Accrington Stanley and Carlisle United before ending his career with non-league Northwich Victoria and Wigan Athletic.

Career statistics
Source:

References

English footballers
Stoke City F.C. players
Chesterfield F.C. players
Southport F.C. players
Bristol Rovers F.C. players
Accrington Stanley F.C. (1891) players
Carlisle United F.C. players
Northwich Victoria F.C. players
Wigan Athletic F.C. players
English Football League players
1912 births
1962 deaths
Association football defenders